Fátima Dzinzaletaite Diame Diame (born 22 September 1996) is a Spanish athlete specializing in the long jump and triple jump. At the age of 17, she became the Spanish national indoor champion in both the long jump and the 60 meters.

Professional career 
Diame was trained at Valencia's Esports Academy and made her professional debut in 2013 at the World Youth Championships in Donetsk. In 2015, she won a bronze medal in Long jump at the European Junior Championships which took place in Eskilstuna, Sweden.

She followed up her success in Sweden by winning a gold medal in 2018 at the Mediterranean Athletics U23 Championships in Jesolo, Italy jumping at a record 13.82m. That same year, she further won two bronze medals: one at the Mediterranean Games in Tarragona, Spain and the other at the Ibero American Championships in Trujillo, Peru.

The highlight of Diame's career came in summer of 2021, when she represented Spain at the Olympic Games in Tokyo, Japan. She finished in 21st place.

In 2022, Diame won gold medal at the Spanish Indoors Championships.

Personal life 
Diame was born in Valencia, Spain to Senegalese immigrant parents.

Diame is a sponsored Adidas Athlete.

International competitions

National titles
Spanish Athletics Championships
Long jump: 2019

Spanish Indoor Athletics Championships
Long jump: 2014, 2018, 2020, 2021, 2022
60 metres: 2014

Personal bests

Outdoor
Long jump – 6.68 (+1.9 m/s, Tarragona 2018)
Triple jump – 14.03 (+0.4 m/s, Torrent 2017)

Indoor
Long jump – 6.71 (Valencia 2020)
Triple jump – 13.92 (Valencia 2020)

References

External links
 
 
 

1995 births
Living people
Spanish female long jumpers
Spanish female triple jumpers
World Athletics Championships athletes for Spain
Spanish people of Senegalese descent
Spanish sportspeople of African descent
Sportspeople from Valencia
Mediterranean Games bronze medalists for Spain
Mediterranean Games medalists in athletics
Athletes (track and field) at the 2018 Mediterranean Games
European Games competitors for Spain
Athletes (track and field) at the 2019 European Games
Spanish Athletics Championships winners
Athletes (track and field) at the 2020 Summer Olympics
Olympic athletes of Spain